The 1945 NC State Wolfpack football team was an American football team that represented North Carolina State University as a member of the Southern Conference (SoCon) during the 1945 college football season. In its second season under head coach Beattie Feathers, the team compiled a 3–6 record (2–4 against SoCon opponents) and was outscored by a total of 144 to 131.

Schedule

References

NC State
NC State Wolfpack football seasons
NC State Wolfpack football